A Man (1979) (transliteration: Enas Andras) is a novel written by Oriana Fallaci chronicling her relationship with the attempted assassin of Greek dictator George Papadopoulos. The book is a pseudo-biography about Alexandros Panagoulis written in the form of a novel. Fallaci had an intense romantic relationship with Panagoulis. She uses the novel to put forth her view that Panagoulis was assassinated by a vast conspiracy, a view widely shared by many Greeks.

Plot summary

The story begins with the attempt by the young engineering student, Alekos Panagoulis, to kill the tyrant of Greece Geōrgios Papadopoulos. Despite numerous precautions, the attack attempt fails and Alekos is captured, tortured and then sentenced to death. In the months to follow the sentence is postponed several times and finally never carried out because in the meantime, in Greece and abroad, the case has taken on some media relevance and the killing of Alekos would result in serious damage to the regime's image.

In this situation Panagoulis secretly continues to be tortured but never shows any intention of bowing to the will of his jailers or becoming a collaborator of the dictatorship. During his imprisonment he tried several times to escape from Boiati prison, where he was locked up, but all attempts failed. In the last two years of imprisonment, he is imprisoned in a cell built specifically for him and called "The Tomb" precisely because of its shape and size similar to a small sepulcher. Exposed to the elements, forced into a limited space and periodically subjected to torture, after years of imprisonment and ill-treatment he is set free, following the grace received from the fake democracy that was established at the fall of the Papadopoulos regime. A few days later he meets Fallaci, who went to visit him to interview him. From that meeting, their love story begins which would last until his death.

Released from prison, Panagoulis, is disputed by both the right and left, but realizes that the current democracy is fake and understands that the parliament is subjugated (albeit indirectly) by the power of the military dictatorship now represented by a new colonel. During this first period he plans subversion against the new government, but he would clash with the silence and ignorance of the people and activists who slowly begin to forget him.

In the following months the two, guarded by the secret services, manage to escape to Italy. There, they seek help from Italian and European politicians in a vain attempt to overthrow the Greek dictator. In Italy the love between Panagoulis and Fallaci matures, so much so that she becomes pregnant, but loses the child in a quarrel with him. The love story alternates between joy and estrangement between the two.

Some time later Panagoulis realizes that from abroad he has no power to change the situation in Greece and therefore decides to return to his homeland. Once back, Panagoulis tries to found his own political party but his initiative fails and joins an existing political party. Since he does not want to side with the right that is in government and that is directly controlled by the dictatorship and does not want to side with the left that wants to indoctrinate his ideas to align them with those of the party, he decides to join the weaker faction: the Centre Union – New Forces. With this party, he succeeds in being elected deputy. Here too, however, he cannot remain within the rigid logic of the scheme and in practice becomes his own independent splinter. It is in this period that he is able to take possession of numerous documents of the Greek secret services and puts himself in open hostility with the one who now rules the ranks of the new dictatorship, the defense minister Evangelos Averoff. Here Panagoulis releases secret documents, but is subsequently killed in a traffic accident caused by two hit men driving two different cars.

In the months immediately following Panagoulis' death, the Greek government does not support the evidence of the murder and declares that it was only a tragic accident. By releasing these declarations, the Greek government ignores the Italian expert reports carried out on the Panagoulis car (which shows the clear signs of ramming and rear-end collisions), ignores the accounts of the witnesses and archives all evidence. Subsequently, to discredit the publication of the secret documents of Panagoulis, the government publishes a revised version of the same, omitting the most compromising ones and publishing only the most harmless ones, possibly reserving the right to change names and dates.

Reviews
The work has had mixed reviews. Some readers find the harsh polemic repetitive and disturbing. Fallaci is said to have been angry at Ms. magazine for not reviewing the work and this enhanced her reputation as an anti-feminist.

Quotes
"Don't help me then, hand me over to the police, what's the use anyway--"
"Of suffering, fighting? It allows us to live, my boy. A man who gives in doesn't live, he survives."

Footnotes

References

1979 novels
20th-century Italian novels
Biographical novels
Novels about rebels
Novels set in Greece
Works by Oriana Fallaci